The speaker of the House of Representatives of the Philippines, more popularly known as the House speaker, is the presiding officer and the highest-ranking official of the lower house of Congress, the House of Representatives, as well as the fourth-highest official of the government of the Philippines.

The speaker is elected by a majority of all of the representatives from among themselves. The speaker is the third and last in the line of succession to the presidency, after the vice president and the Senate president.

A speaker may be removed from office in a coup, or can be replaced by death or resignation. In some cases, a speaker may be compelled to resign at the middle of a Congress' session after he has lost support of the majority of congressmen; in that case, an election for a new speaker is held. Despite being a partisan official, the speaker (or whoever is presiding) does not vote unless in breaking ties in accordance with the Rules of the House of Representatives.

The current House speaker is Martin Romualdez of Leyte-1st congressional district. He was elected as speaker on July 25, 2022, the first day of the 19th Congress.

Election 

When the office of speaker is vacant (usually at the beginning of a new Congress), the secretary-general of the House sits as the speaker until a person is elected. A speaker is usually elected via majority vote via roll call of the representatives, after nomination at the start of each new Congress. Usually, despite the current multi-party system used, only two representatives are nominated, with nominations being agreed upon before each Congress during caucuses between the administration and opposition coalitions, with the chosen candidate of the majority coalition being almost certain to win by a large margin. The two competing candidates by tradition vote for each other; those who voted for the speaker-elect is assigned as the "majority" coalition while those who didn't are the minority coalition, with the losing candidate usually being named as minority leader.

In the 2013 election, there were three candidates for the speakership. In this case, the candidates didn't vote for each other, and the second-placed candidate became minority leader and headed the minority bloc. The third-placed candidate became the leader of the "independent minority" bloc. Only the majority and minority blocs were given seats in committees. There was a chance that neither candidate would get a majority of votes; it is undetermined on what should be done if that happened.

Role
According to Section 15 of Rule 4 of the Rules of the House of Representatives, the duties and powers
of the speaker as the political and administrative head of the House are as follows:

a. prepare the legislative agenda for every regular session, establish systems and procedures
to ensure full deliberation and swift approval of measures included therein, and may, for
the purpose, avail of the assistance of the Deputy Speakers, the Majority Leader, the
Chairpersons of the standing committees and other Members of the House;

b. conduct regular monthly caucus of all Members or groups thereof or as often as may be
necessary to discuss priority measures and to facilitate dialogue, consensus and action on
issues and concerns affecting the House and the performance of its functions;

c. exercise general supervision over all committees and, in furtherance thereof, conduct
regular monthly meetings with the Chairpersons and Vice-Chairpersons of all standing and
special committees to set legislative targets, review performance in the attainment of
targets, ensure that the priority legislative measures of committees are attuned to the
legislative agenda of the House, and resolve such other issues and concerns that affect the
operations and performance of the committees;

d. as far as practicable, establish an efficient information management system in the House
utilizing among others, modern digital technology, that can:

1. facilitate access to and
dissemination of data and information needed in legislation inclusive of facilitating real
time translation of plenary proceedings in the major Philippine dialects and languages;

2. provide a simplified and comprehensive process of gathering, recording, storage and
retrieval of data and information relating to activities and proceedings of the House;

3.sustain a public information program that will provide accessible, timely and accurate
information relating to the House, its Members and officers, its committees and its
legislative concerns inclusive of facilitating, as far as practicable, broadcast coverage of
plenary and committee proceedings;

e. establish an efficient and effective system to monitor and evaluate the performance of
legislative tasks and duties of the House, its Members and its committees;

f. establish coordinative linkages with the Senate of the Philippines to efficiently monitor and
facilitate Senate action on House measures pending with the same;

g. preside over the sessions of the House and decide all questions of order subject to appeal
by any Member who may explain the appeal in not more than five (5) minutes: Provided,
That the appeal shall not be subject to debate, and no explanation of vote shall be allowed
in case of nominal voting;

h. designate a Member as temporary presiding officer after informing the Deputy Speakers:
Provided, That any such designation shall be effective for one session day only;

i. take appropriate measures as may be deemed advisable or as the House may direct, to
preserve order and decorum in the session hall, the galleries, lobbies, chambers, offices,
corridors and premises of the House;

j. sign all acts, resolutions, memorials, writs, warrants and subpoenas that may be issued by
or upon order of the House;

k. perform administrative functions such as, among others:

k1. appointment of personnel of the House with authority to delegate this power;

k2. suspension, dismissal or imposition of other disciplinary measures on House personnel
in accordance with Civil Service rules: Provided, That the suspension or dismissal of
the Secretary General and the Sergeant-at-Arms shall take effect only upon the
concurrence of the majority of all the Members;

k3. consolidation or splitting of vacant positions carrying salaries and wages which may be
increased or reduced in the process, and/or creation of new positions in accordance
with the General Appropriations Act: Provided, That the total amount involved shall
not exceed the total amount appropriated for the salaries and wages of the personnel
of the House; and

k4. implementation of merit-based policies and programs on personnel recruitment,
training and development, promotions, incentives and benefits to ensure that the
House has a corps of competent professionals able to provide needed legislative
support services;

l. prepare the annual budget of the House with the assistance of the Committee on
Accounts;

m. in consultation with the Committee on Rules, prepare the rules and regulations governing
public access to personal data and related information, including statements of assets and
liabilities, of Members of the House;

n. in consultation with the Minority Leader, shall develop through an appropriate entity of the
House a system for drug testing in the House of Representatives, which may provide for
the testing of any Member, officer, or employee of the House, and otherwise shall be
comparable in scope to the system for drug testing in the executive branch, Provided, That
the expenses of the system may be paid from applicable accounts of the House for official
expenses; and

o. require the submission of performance reports at the end of every regular session and
fiscal year from the committee chairpersons, the Secretary General and the Sergeant-at-Arms,
and such other reports as may be required from all concerned officers and offices of
the House.

And according to Section 16 of the Rule 4 of the Rules of the House, the speaker must "be the permanent head of delegation and representative of the House in all international parliamentary gatherings and organizations: Provided, that the Speaker may designate any Member to be the representative of the Speaker. The Speaker
shall also determine, upon the recommendation of the Majority Leader, in consultation with
the Chairperson of the Committee on Inter-Parliamentary Relations and Diplomacy, who shall
constitute the House delegation to any international conference or forum of parliamentarians
and legislators and the secretariat support staff to be mobilized for the purpose."

List of speakers

Speakers per region

List of speakers per party (24 speakers)

Timeline

See also
House of Representatives of the Philippines
Deputy Speakers of the House of Representatives of the Philippines
Majority Floor Leader of the House of Representatives of the Philippines
Minority Floor Leader of the House of Representatives of the Philippines

Notes

References

 
Legislative speakers in the Philippines
Philippines
Political office-holders in the Philippines